The London Underground S7 and S8 Stock, commonly referred to as S Stock, is a type of passenger train running on the London Underground's subsurface lines since 2010. Manufactured by Bombardier Transportation's Derby Litchurch Lane Works, the S Stock was ordered to replace the A60, A62, C69, C77 and D78 stock on the Metropolitan, District, Hammersmith & City, and Circle lines, which all dated from the 1960s and 1970s. The order was for a total of 192 trains (1,403 cars), and consisted of two types, S7 Stock for the Circle, District and Hammersmith & City lines, and S8 Stock for the Metropolitan line, with differences in the arrangement of seating and number of cars. Both types have air-conditioning and lower floors to ease accessibility for disabled people, and also have open gangways to allow passengers to move from one car to another whilst the train is moving.

The order was said to be the biggest single rolling-stock order in Britain at, according to Transport for London, a cost of £1.5 billion.

Passenger service began on the Metropolitan line in July 2010, the Hammersmith & City line in July 2012, and the Circle and District lines in September 2013. The S Stock completely replaced the A Stock on the Metropolitan line in September 2012, and the C Stock on the Circle and Hammersmith & City lines in February 2014, and on the Edgware Road branch of the District line in June 2014; it fully replaced the D Stock on the rest of the District line in April 2017.

Overview 

The S designation stands for sub-surface following the London Underground tradition of designating surface stock with a letter associated with its intended route—A Stock on the Metropolitan line to Amersham, the C Stock on the Circle line, and D Stock on the District line.

Part of Bombardier's Movia family, the stock consists of 133 S7 seven-car trains for the Circle, District and Hammersmith & City lines, and 59 S8 eight-car trains for the Metropolitan line. There were also three additional eight-car trains called an S7+1 in use on the Metropolitan Line while the eight-car S8 trains were returned for engineering modifications and ATC fitment. These trains were formed of a seven-car S7 and an additional car from another S7, forming an eight-car train. These trains, however, retained the all-longitudinal seating of the S7, and thus could be distinguished from the remaining S8s. Two of these trains were modified back to seven-car trains and transferred for service on the Circle, District and Hammersmith & City Lines in 2018. The S8 Stock entered service between 2010 and 2012, operating all services by September 2012.

During the period of dual operation with both old and new trains, the stock had its performance capped to match that of the older trains in order to comply with signalling constraints and avoid bunching of the service. S8 stock trains seat 306 passengers compared with 448 for A Stock, a reduction of 32%, but can accommodate 25% more standing passengers (1,226 compared with 976) and have dedicated space for wheelchairs.

The voltage has been increased from nominal 630 volts to 750 volts. This allows for better performance and also for the increased power demands of air-conditioned, fully motored-axle trains, and allow the trains to return energy to the network through regenerative braking.

Currently, the S Stock is manually operated on most of the Metropolitan line and about half of the District line; the Circle and Hammersmith & City lines are fully automatic. The section between Latimer Road and Hammersmith was the first to be switched over to automatic operation on 10 March 2019, with further extensions being implemented in stages called Signal Migration Areas (SMA); as of January 2023 the first six SMA areas have been implemented. Due to various reasons such as funding and technical difficulties, District line automation where it shares tracks with Network Rail or Piccadilly line services has been scaled back until further notice.

Features 

The S Stock is air-conditioned throughout: the sub-surface tunnels (unlike deep-level tube lines) allow the exhausted hot air to disperse, and two-thirds of the sub-surface network is in the open air. The stock has regenerative brakes, returning around 20% of their energy to the network and thus increasing energy efficiency.

End external displays show two lines of text: the top line for the destination, and the bottom for the line. Internally, it has larger dot matrix indicators (DMIs) than D Stock (A and C Stock lacked DMIs). The DMIs show destination and line, and can display other messages such as safety notices. There are also DMIs on the exterior, with text alternating between destination and line, and on S8 Stock the stopping pattern (fast, semi-fast or all stations). The S8 Stock is the first on the Metropolitan line with dot-matrix indicators and automated voice announcements.

The air-conditioning system, the first on London Underground trains, is supplied by Mitsubishi and has two circuits so that if one fails there is still 50% capacity. Open gangways from car to car (similar to London Overground's Class 378) allow passengers to move from crowded cars to ones with more room, provide extra room for standing, and create a sense of security. CCTV enables the driver to see into every car, while track-to-train video links give the driver a view of the train exterior before leaving a station. There is a fold-out set of steps in each driver's cab to allow fast evacuation in an emergency.

The S stock has cantilevered seating for easy cleaning and accessible storage of bags. The seating configurations are different between the two models of trains: the S7 Stock, used on inner city lines with higher passenger traffic, has longitudinal seating throughout, while the S8 Stock, used for the longer journeys from the outer suburbs, has a mix of transverse and longitudinal seating, with four wheelchair spaces per train.

To prevent accidental pressing of emergency alarms, there are flaps over the alarm buttons next to wheelchair spaces.

Although S Stock trains can operate on all four sub-surface lines, S8 trains are used on the Metropolitan line and S7 trains are used on the other three lines. Selective door operation is used at certain stations that are shorter than the train. S7 Stock has seven cars per train, while S8 Stock has eight.

Design icon 
As part of the Transported by Design programme of activities, on 15 October 2015, after two months of public voting, the walk-through S Stock train was elected by Londoners as one of the 10 favourite transport design icons.

Entry into service 
Following the implementation of the London Underground Public Private Partnership (PPP) in 2003, the Metronet consortium became responsible for the infrastructure on the District, Circle, Hammersmith & City and Metropolitan lines. As part of the consortium, Bombardier Transportation would design, build and maintain new trains for these lines. 190 trains would be built by Bombardier at Derby Litchurch Lane Works - 40 trains for the Circle and Hammersmith & City lines, 78 trains for the District line, and 72 trains for the Metropolitan line. All the trains would be built to the same design, saving on parts and maintenance costs for Metronet. The only difference would be the length of the train, given different platform lengths on different lines. The first train was planned to enter service on the Metropolitan line by 2009, with all trains in service by 2015.

In December 2006, Metronet and London Underground unveiled the completed design, with air-conditioning and walk through carriages for the first time on the Underground. London Underground also announced that 40 additional cars had been ordered from Metronet/Bombardier at a cost of £105 million. This would allow for a seventh carriage on Circle and Hammersmith & City line trains, unifying the fleet with the District line trains.

In July 2007, Metronet, the private consortium responsible for the infrastructure for the sub-surfaces lines, collapsed due to financial difficulties. Following negotiations with Bombardier to allow for continued delivery of 2009 Stock and S Stock trains, TfL took ownership of Metronet in May 2008.

A mockup of the train was shown off to the public in September 2008, with testing of the trains prior to delivery taking place at Old Dalby Test Track in Leicestershire from March 2009. This prevented the need for weekend or evening closures of lines in London to test trains. The first train was delivered to London Underground in October 2009. Built at Bombardier's Derby Litchurch Lane Works, trains were constructed at a rate of six a week at the height of production.

In 2015, TfL ordered an additional S8 train as part of the Croxley Rail Link at a cost of £15.5million, taking the total ordered to 192. The final set was delivered 10 November 2016. The extension to the Metropolitan line was cancelled in 2017.

Metropolitan line 

Driver training began in early January 2010, and the first train entered revenue service on 31 July 2010, shuttling between Wembley Park and Watford.

By 27 June 2011, S8 Stock was running along the whole Metropolitan line. Deliveries were suspended by Transport for London in November 2011 due to concerns over reliability. A number of trains were delivered to London Underground's Neasden Depot, but were not accepted to enter service. Deliveries resumed in mid-December 2011.

In August 2012, London Underground confirmed that strap handles would be introduced on S8 Stock, in response to passenger complaints over the height of the handrails as compared with A Stock.

By 15 September 2012, all 58 S8 trains had been delivered to Neasden Depot. The A Stock trains were completely withdrawn 11 days later. In November 2012, it was reported that 37 of the new trains would be sent back to Bombardier for urgent modification at Bombardier's cost, and that drivers were unhappy with their cabs. An additional S8 train was later delivered, as part of the subsequently cancelled Croxley Rail Link project.

Hammersmith & City line 

The first trains entered service on 6 July 2012, from Hammersmith to Moorgate.

On 4 December 2012, an S7 train went east of Moorgate to Barking for testing. This was the first time an S7 train had been seen in peak hours. S7 Stock began operating a full service from Hammersmith to Barking on 9 December 2012. The line was completely operated with S7 stock from 11 February 2014.

Circle line 
The S7 Stock entered service on the Circle line on 2 September 2013, and completely replaced the C Stock trains on the line by 11 February 2014.

The Circle line's C Stock were replaced ahead of the District line's D Stock, as they were described by London Underground as being "in an increasingly poor state", and the D Stock had been extensively refurbished between 2005 and 2008.

District line 

The District line was the last line to be fully served by the S7 Stock, due to its existing D78 Stock being newer than other trains that the S7 Stock was ordered to replace, as well as its most recent refurbishment in 2005. The first S7 Stock train entered passenger service on the line between Olympia and West Ham on 2 September 2013.

On 6 February 2014, the S7 Stock started running between Wimbledon and Edgware Road. The S7 Stock started services to Ealing Broadway on 13 June 2014, and on 17 June saw the start of commercial service to Richmond. On 16 January 2015, the S7 Stock began running to Upminster. Withdrawal of the D78 Stock began on 19 January. In November 2016, the last of 192 trains were completed by Bombardier and handed over to London Underground.

The D78 Stock was completely replaced by the S7 with the withdrawal of the final unit from service on 21 April 2017.

Accidents and incidents
Another train formed of two British Rail Class 165 diesel multiple units overran a signal at danger and the trains were in danger of a head-on collision.

List of cars 
Each car has a five-digit number: the second digit identifies the type of car, the last three digits the set number (001–116, 301–568). A-end cars have odd numbers; D-end even numbers. 25nnn cars replace 23nnn cars on trains equipped with de-icing equipment.

See also 
Victoria line 2009 Tube Stock, also part of Bombardier's Movia family
London Overground Class 378
New Tube for London

References

External links 

 S Stock data sheet
 Article about the new S7 trains entering service onto the Hammersmith and City Line

S
Bombardier Transportation multiple units
Train-related introductions in 2010
750 V DC multiple units